Kirchspielslandgemeinde Tellingstedt was an Amt ("collective municipality") in the district of Dithmarschen, in Schleswig-Holstein, Germany. Its seat was in Tellingstedt. In January 2008, it was merged with the Ämter Kirchspielslandgemeinde Hennstedt and Kirchspielslandgemeinde Lunden to form the Amt Kirchspielslandgemeinden Eider.

The Amt Kirchspielslandgemeinde Tellingstedt consisted of the following municipalities (with population in 2005):

 Dellstedt (801)
 Dörpling (611)
 Gaushorn (213)
 Hövede (64)
 Pahlen (1.168)
 Schalkholz (595)
 Süderdorf (396)
 Tellingstedt (2.493)
 Tielenhemme (178)
 Wallen (37)
 Welmbüttel (465)
 Westerborstel (98)
 Wrohm (732)

Former Ämter in Schleswig-Holstein